Asian Washingtonians are residents of the state of Washington who are of Asian ancestry. As of the 2010 U.S. Census, Asian-Americans were 7.7% of the state's population.  As per the 2019 it’s 9-10%.

Distribution
Chinese Americans are the largest group at nearly 2% of the state’s population and 1.4%  Chinese alone. Japanese, Koreans, Vietnamese, Indians, and Filipinos are plentiful. Seattle is 5% Chinese, and 15% Asian. Nearby Bellevue has a larger Chinese and Asian/Asian Indian population, at least 25%. 

Significant Asian Seattle communities include Chinatown-International District, Beacon Hill and Capitol Hill.

See also
Wing Luke Museum of the Asian Pacific American Experience
History of Chinese Americans in Seattle
History of the Japanese in Seattle

References

External links

A History Bursting With Telling: Asian Americans in Washington State